Eli Ayers (May 9, 1778 – April 25, 1822) was a physician and the first colonial agent of the American Colonization Society in what later became Liberia. He was born in 1778 in Shiloh, New Jersey, and married Elizabeth West in 1812. He practiced medicine in Woodbury, New Jersey. Together with Robert F. Stockton of  he extorted a treaty under duress with six tribal kings on the purchase of land at Cape Mesurado. He served as the colonial agent of the American Colonization Society from December 15, 1821, until his death on April 25, 1822.

References

1778 births
1822 deaths
Agents and Governors of Liberia
People from Cumberland County, New Jersey
People from Woodbury, New Jersey